Spea or SPEA may refer to:
 Spea, a genus of amphibians
 SpeA, an enzyme also known as arginine decarboxylase
 SPEA (company), an Italian tech company
 School of Public and Environmental Affairs at Indiana University